Good is the first album by the Boston-based alternative rock trio Morphine. It was released in 1992 on the Accurate/Distortion label. It was reissued by Rykodisc in 1993 after the band signed with the label.

Critical reception

Trouser Press wrote that the album "establishes the goods, excavating a slippery, sultry groove that suggests blues and bebop without becoming either by providing ample room in the spacious mix for two evocative voices." AllMusic wrote, "While it may not be as stellar as their future releases would be ... Good did a splendid job of introducing the Boston trio's highly original sound. While it was the alternative crowd who immediately latched onto Morphine, their music was geared more toward the jazz scene – a wailing saxophone, lead bass (played with a slide), and lyrics influenced by '50s beat poetry were all-important ingredients."

Track listing 

Japanese edition bonus track

2020 vinyl expanded edition 
On September 9, 2019, the Run Out Groove label announced that Good had been voted as their next vinyl rerelease and would include a bonus record of unreleased tracks remastered from the original source tapes. It was released on January 17, 2020.
 side one (1-6) and two (7-13) as per original album

Notes
All tracks on side three and four were recorded between 1989 and 1991. All tracks, except "Shame" and "Mona's Sister", are previously unreleased. "Shame" was released in 1993 as a B-side to the "Cure for Pain" single, and "Mona's Sister" was included on the 2004 box set Sandbox: The Mark Sandman Box Set.

Personnel 
Adapted from the album's liner notes.

Morphine
 Mark Sandman – vocals, 2-string slide bass, organ, guitar, tritar
 Dana Colley – baritone saxophone, tenor saxophone, double saxophone, triangle, backing vocals on "You Look Like Rain"
 Jerome Deupree – drums
Additional musicians
 Billy Conway – drums on "You Speak My Language" and "You Look Like Rain"
 Jim Fitting – bass harmonica on "I Know You (Part I)"
Technical
 Mark Sandman – producer 
 Paul Q. Kolderie – co-producer, engineer (1, 2, 4, 5, 7, 9, 10, 13)
 Tom Dubé – co-producer, engineer (3, 8, 11, 12)
 Mike Dineen – mixing (9)
 Toby Mountain – mastering
 Eric Pfeiffer - artwork
Notes
 Tracks 1, 2, 4, 5, 7, 9, 10 and 13 recorded at The Outpost.
 Tracks 3, 8, 11 and 12 recorded at Q Division and Fort Apache
 Track 6 recorded at High-N-Dry.

References

1992 debut albums
Morphine (band) albums
Albums produced by Paul Q. Kolderie
Rykodisc albums